Pomahuaca District is one of twelve districts of the province Jaén in Peru.

See also 
 Inka Tampu

References